Orland Steen "Spike" Loomis (November 2, 1893 – December 7, 1942) was an American lawyer.  He was elected to be the 31st Governor of Wisconsin in 1942, but died before taking office. He previously served as the 28th Attorney General of Wisconsin. He was a member of the Wisconsin Progressive Party.

Biography
Orland Loomis was born in Mauston, Wisconsin. He received his law degree from the University of Wisconsin Law School in 1917. He was stationed in France during World War I, after which he returned to Mauston to practice law, serving as the city attorney from 1922 to 1931.  He was elected to the Wisconsin State Assembly in 1928 and the Wisconsin State Senate in 1930. From 1935 to 1937 Loomis was director of the Rural Electrification Administration in Wisconsin.  He was then elected Attorney General of Wisconsin, serving from 1937 to 1939.

After narrowly losing the 1940 election for Governor of Wisconsin as a Progressive, Loomis ran again in 1942, defeating the incumbent Governor Julius Heil. He died suddenly of a heart attack a month before he was to take office, and the Republican Lieutenant Governor Walter Samuel Goodland served all of Loomis's term as acting governor.

Orland Steen Loomis was buried in Mauston. Loomis Road (WIS 36) in Milwaukee County is named after him.

Loomis married Florence Marie Ely on June 22, 1918.  They had three children.

In 1943, the Liberty Ship SS Orland Loomis was named after him.

References

External links
Orland S. Loomis, Dictionary of Wisconsin History, Wisconsin State Historical Society

|-

|-

1893 births
1942 deaths
20th-century American politicians
Burials in Wisconsin
Elected officials who died without taking their seats
Republican Party governors of Wisconsin
Republican Party members of the Wisconsin State Assembly
Military personnel from Wisconsin
People from Mauston, Wisconsin
Progressive Party (1924) state governors of the United States
United States Army officers
United States Army personnel of World War I
University of Wisconsin Law School alumni
Wisconsin Attorneys General
Wisconsin Progressives (1924)
Republican Party Wisconsin state senators